Linga Holm, commonly known as Linga, Midgarth and the Holm of Midgarth  is an uninhabited Scottish island extending to approximately  situated  west of Stronsay island in the Orkney archipelago. The name "Linga Holm" is derived from the Old Norse Lyngholm.

History
In common with many other Orkney islands, Linga Holm contains numerous archaeological remains. These include Pictish houses and ancient cairns.

Although it is currently uninhabited, a household of six was recorded in 1841.

Sheep

In 1973 the Rare Breeds Survival Trust established a refuge population here of the very rare North Ronaldsay sheep, and the flock now numbers some 400.

Wildlife
It is thought to be the third largest breeding ground for the Atlantic grey seal in the world, and is an important nesting site for greylag geese.

See also
Fogou
List of Orkney Islands

References

External links 
 

Uninhabited islands of Orkney